The spectacled tyrant (Hymenops perspicillatus) is a species of bird in the tyrant flycatcher family Tyrannidae. It is the only species placed in the genus Hymenops.

It is found in Chile, Argentina and Uruguay; it is a vagrant to Bolivia, Paraguay and southeastern Brazil, once even in far northeastern Brazil. 
Its natural habitats are subtropical or tropical dry shrubland and swamps.

Taxonomy
The spectacled tyrant was formally described in 1789 by the German naturalist Johann Friedrich Gmelin in his revised and expanded edition of Carl Linnaeus's Systema Naturae. He placed it with the wagtails in the genus Motacilla and coined the binomial name Motacilla perspicillata. Gmelin based his description on "Le clignot ou traquet à lunette" that had been described in 1778 by the French polymath the Comte de Buffon in his Histoire Naturelle des Oiseaux. The spectacled tyrant is now the only species placed in the genus Hymenops that was introduced in 1828 by the French naturalist René Lesson. The genus name is from Ancient Greek humēn meaning "skin" or "membrane" and ōps meaning "eye". The specific epithet perspicillatus is Modern Latin meaning "spectacled". Within the family Tyrannidae the spectacled tyrant  is sister to the genus Knipolegus containing the black tyrants.

Two subspecies are recognised:
 H. p. perspicillatus (Gmelin, JF, 1789) – southeast Brazil, Uruguay and east Paraguay to central north Argentina
 H. p. andinus (Ridgway, 1879) – central Chile and central west, central south Argentina

References

spectacled tyrant
Birds of Argentina
Birds of Chile
Birds of Uruguay
spectacled tyrant
spectacled tyrant
Taxonomy articles created by Polbot